Orculella creticostata is a species of aerobic (air-breathing) land snail, a terrestrial pulmonate gastropod mollusc in the family Orculidae.

Geographic distribution
O. creticostata is endemic to Greece, where it occurs in the western part of the island of Crete.

See also
List of non-marine molluscs of Greece

References 

Orculidae
Molluscs of Europe
Endemic fauna of Crete
Gastropods described in 2004